A national security advisor serves as the chief advisor to a national government on matters of security. The advisor is not usually a member of the government's cabinet but is usually a member of various military or security councils.

National security advisors by country
National Security Advisor (Canada)
National Security Advisor (India)
National Security Advisor (Israel)
National Security Advisor (Nigeria)
National Security Advisor (Pakistan)
National Security Adviser (United Kingdom)
National Security Advisor (United States)
National Security Advisor (Japan)

Presidential advisors
Former disambiguation pages converted to set index articles